Alba Merino Sánchez (born 15 May 1989) is a Spanish football midfielder who plays for Deportivo La Coruña of Spain's Segunda División. As of July 2021, she holds the record for being the youngest footballer to feature in Spain's Primera División. She also scored Deportivo's first ever goal in the Primera División.

Career

Merino is originally from Guadiana. Playing for Puebla, in 2003, she became the youngest player to feature in the top tier of women's football in Spain and, as of July 2021, she remains the holder of this record. In 2007, her transfer from Puebla to Atlético Madrid was announced. At Atlético, she played alongside Jennifer Hermoso and was the team's top goalscorer in the 2008–09 season. In the summer of 2018, she transferred from Santa Teresa to Deportivo La Coruña. While playing for Deportivo, in the club's 2018–19 season, she participated in their promotion to the Primera División, scoring 17 goals in 21 league games. Merino would go on to score Deportivo's first ever goal in the top tier of Spanish football, scoring a header against Espanyol after a shot from Noelia Villegas was adjudged to have not crossed the line. She also featured in 18 out of the team's first 21 fixtures in the 2019–20 season. Following Deportivo's relegation back to the Segunda División in the following season, Deportivo renewed Merino's contract for one more season, indicating their intention to build the team around Merino.

References

External links
Profile at Deportivo La Coruña

1989 births
Living people
Spanish women's footballers
Primera División (women) players
Levante UD Femenino players
Atlético Madrid Femenino players
Santa Teresa CD players
Sportspeople from Badajoz
Footballers from Extremadura
Women's association football midfielders
Deportivo de La Coruña (women) players